George Austen (c. 1548 – 1621), of Guildford and Shalford, Surrey, was an English politician.

Family
Austen was the son of MP, John Austen, MP for Guildford in 1563. He made three marriages, with issue from all three. Two of his sons were University men, one at Oxford and one at Cambridge.

Career
He was a Member (MP) of the Parliament of England for Haslemere in 1597 and for Guildford in 1604.

References

1548 births
1621 deaths
English MPs 1597–1598
English MPs 1604–1611
People from Surrey